Helmut Haid (18 November 1938 – 8 June 2019) was an Austrian hurdler. He competed in the men's 400 metres hurdles at the 1964 Summer Olympics.

References

1938 births
2019 deaths
Athletes (track and field) at the 1964 Summer Olympics
Austrian male hurdlers
Olympic athletes of Austria
Sportspeople from Innsbruck